Cosmosoma consolata is a moth of the family Erebidae. It was described by Francis Walker in 1856. It is found in Brazil.

References

consolata
Moths described in 1856